Qutluğ Säbig Qatun (title - ; personal name - , also known as Po Beg) was the khatun (queen) and then hansha (queen mother) of the Second Turkic Khaganate. She served as regent during the minority of Tengri Qaghan in 734-741.

Khatun
Her father was Tonyukuk, an apa tarkan, a title equivalent to prime minister. She married Bilge Khagan (683 or 684-734) before 717, while he was still a tegin (prince). 

In 734, Bilge was poisoned. Before dying, however, he accused Buyruk Chor, a high governor of the empire, who had previously been to China and had him executed. Bilge's sons succeeded him. After the death of his first son Yollıg Khagan (commissioner of  Khöshöö Tsaidam monuments), his other son Tengri Qaghan (?-741) was enthroned.

Regent
Tengri was young and Sebeg acted like a queen regent. However, the real power was in the hands of two shads (local governors), one in the west and the other in the east. Sebeg tried to centralize the power and planned to execute the two governors. She had the governor in the west executed but Pan Kül Tigin, the governor in the east, became suspicious and revolted, killing Tengri Qaghan 742. Two years later, the empire was dissolved following a joint rebel of Uyghurs, Karluks and Basmyls.

During the last days of the empire, Sebeg, together with her clan, took refuge in Tang China. Emperor Xuanzong of Tang greeted her and threw a banquet for her. She was given the title of princess, and was appointed the ruler of her people. According to the New Book of Tang, Xuanzong sent flour to her clan during the harvest season. According to Russian historian Lev Gumilyov (1912–1992), she saved her people but not her nation.

Accusations
Turkish journalist Ahmet Akyol asserts that Buyruk Chor was not responsible for Bilge Khaghan’s death. Probably Sebeg poisoned her husband because Bilge Khagan had planned to sign a treaty of commerce with Tang China and, as was the custom, he would marry a Chinese princess after signing the treaty. Baumer claims that Sebeg usurped power and shared it with her lover. Liu Mao-Tsai suggested that Sebeg had Yollig poisoned and put the minor Tengri on the throne so that she could be regent, and that she kept the death of Yollig secret from the Chinese which explains the variations in death dates.

References

Sources

Göktürk khagans
8th-century Turkic women
8th-century women rulers
Year of birth unknown
Queens consort
Ashide
Turkic female royalty